Joabe Batista Pereira or simply Joabe  (born May 29, 1989, in Serra), is a Brazilian attacking midfielder. Since 2011, he has played for Sociedade Esportiva do Gama.

External links
 websoccerclub
 soccer-talents
 sambafoot
 CBF
 cruzeiro.com

1989 births
Living people
Brazilian footballers
Cruzeiro Esporte Clube players
Association football midfielders